Częstochowa Raków railway station is a railway station in the Raków district of Częstochowa, Poland. It is served by the Polish State Railways, who run services from Warsaw West to Katowice (line 1) and from Częstochowa to Kucelinka (line 701).

The historical names of the station are: Bleszno (1914-1918), Bierzno (1918-1920), Błeszno (1920-1939), Bleschno (1939-1945), Błeszno (1945-1948) and Częstochowa Błeszno (1948-1966).

Train services
The station is served by the following service(s):

 Regional services (PR) Częstochowa - Włoszczowa
 Regional services (PR) Częstochowa - Włoszczowa - Kielce
 Regional services (PR) Częstochowa - Włoszczowa - Kielce - Busko-Zdrój

Regional Service (KŚ)  Gliwice – Zabrze - Katowice – Zawiercie - Częstochowa
Regional services (KŚ)  Tychy Lodowisko - Katowice - Sosnowiec Główny - Dąbrowa Górnicza Ząbkowice - Zawiercie

References 

Raków
Buildings and structures in Częstochowa